Archiphytalmia is a genus of tephritid  or fruit flies in the family Tephritidae.  It is considered a synonym of Phytalmia.

References

Phytalmiinae